Zdeněk Groessl (born 8 September 1941) is a Czech former volleyball player who competed for Czechoslovakia in the 1968 Summer Olympics and in the 1972 Summer Olympics.

He was born in Plzeň.

In 1968 he was part of the Czechoslovak team which won the bronze medal in the Olympic tournament. He played all nine matches.

Four years later he finished sixth with the Czechoslovak team in the 1972 Olympic tournament. He played six matches.

External links
 
 

1941 births
Living people
Czech men's volleyball players
Czechoslovak men's volleyball players
Olympic volleyball players of Czechoslovakia
Volleyball players at the 1968 Summer Olympics
Volleyball players at the 1972 Summer Olympics
Olympic bronze medalists for Czechoslovakia
Sportspeople from Plzeň
Olympic medalists in volleyball
Medalists at the 1968 Summer Olympics